A Journey's End is the second album of the Irish black metal band Primordial. It was originally released in 1998.

It was first re-released in 2005 by Candlelight Records with Imrama as a two disc set. Metal Blade Records re-released this in Europ on 1 September 2009 in Europe (29 August in Germany, Switzerland and Austria) with updated graphics and liner notes.

Track listing

Note: On the 2005 reissue, track 7 is listed as "An Aistear Deirneach".

Bonus CD – Live at the Ritz, Lisbon, Portugal, 9 December 1999
 Infernal Summer
 The Calling
 Journey's End
 Children of the Harvest
 The Burning Season
 The Purging Fire (Gods to the Godless)
 Autumns Ablaze
 Let the Sun Set on Life Forever
 Graven Idol
 To Enter Pagan

Credits
Alan Averill – Vocals 
Ciáran MacUiliam – Guitar, Mandolin, Whistles
Pól "Paul" MacAmlaigh – Bass
Simon Ó Laoghaire – Drums, Bodhran

References

Primordial (band) albums
1998 albums